Mark Cohen is a Canadian laser eye surgeon who practices in Montreal and Toronto. In 2001, he and Avi Wallerstein founded LASIK MD, Canada's largest provider of laser refractive surgery. As of 2013, LASIK MD performs over sixty percent of all laser vision correction procedures in Canada. He is one of only 14 certified C-LASIK instructors in North America.

Education
Cohen completed his medical degree (MD, CM) in 1992 and specialization in ophthalmology (FRCSC) at McGill University. At McGill, he was a recipient of the Holmes Gold Medal, awarded to the graduate with the highest aggregate academic standing upon completion of medical school. Following residency, he completed his training with a post-doctoral fellowship in corneal transplantation surgery and laser vision correction of the cornea at the Université de Montréal. He previously attended Vanier College in Montreal.

Professional work 
Cohen is a certified C-LASIK instructor, one of 14 surgeons in North America with the designation to teach LASIK by the developers of the first LASIK microkeratome (Chiron).  In 2000, he co-authored the Quebec government’s Council for the Evaluation of Health Care Technology's report on LASIK and PRK, a document designated for the public. Cohen was a clinical assessor for Bausch and Lomb for the zero compression Hansatome microkeratome, specifically designed to allow for safer and thinner corneal flaps for LASIK surgery. He is one of two National Medical Directors for LASIK MD (2001–present).

Cohen is a North American pioneer in the treatment of keratoconus and ectatic diseases of the cornea.  As a method of treating the underlying disease and reversing the damage that has previously occurred, he began performing corneal collagen cross linking combined with topography guided excimer laser ablations in 2009.  Based on the results of these treatments, he developed the Montreal Protocol, a standardized method to treat keratoconus and post-op ectasia, which is now used in over 15 Canadian cities.  Due to FDA restrictions, this treatment remains unavailable in the United States as of 2017.

Cohen is the President/CEO of LASIK MD (2001–present) and Cataract MD (2004–present), and co-National Medical Director (2001–present). In 2014, LASIK MD earned Platinum Club status in Canada's Best Managed Companies competition sponsored by Deloitte, CIBC, the National Post and Queen's School of Business. Platinum Club status is awarded to those organizations who have been Best Managed Companies for seven consecutive years or more.

Partners
In 2016, concurrent with an investment by the Caisse de Dépôt (CDPQ) in LASIK MD, a Board of Directors was created and Cohen was named the Chairman (2016–present).

Awards
In 2007, Cohen was awarded the Bank of Montreal Arista award organized by the Young Chamber of Commerce of Montreal as Quebec’s leading Young Professional for the year. In 2006, he received the Howard Stotland Technology Award for Young Technology Entrepreneur of the Year. In 2008, Cohen was named one of Canada's Top 40 Under 40. He is a Quebec recipient of the Ernst & Young 2008 Entrepreneur of the Year Award in the professional/financial services category and received a National Citation in honour of Service Excellence.

References

External links
LASIK MD

Living people
Canadian ophthalmologists
Place of birth missing (living people)
Year of birth missing (living people)